Midway is an unincorporated community in Hinds County, Mississippi, United States. A post office operated under the name Midway from 1869 to 1904.

References

Unincorporated communities in Hinds County, Mississippi
Unincorporated communities in Mississippi